The Symphony No. 2 in A major by Russian composer Vasily Kalinnikov was composed from 1895–1897 and first published in 1901. The symphony is dedicated to Alexander Winogradsky.

Instrumentation
The symphony is scored for:

Woodwinds
piccolo
2 flutes
2 oboes (2nd also cor anglais)
2 clarinets (A)
2 bassoons

Brass
4 horns
2 trumpets (D)
3 trombones
tuba

Percussion
timpani

Strings
harp (second movement only)
violins I, II
violas
cellos
double basses

Form 
A typical performance lasts around 40 minutes. The work is in four movements:

See also
 Symphony No. 1 (Kalinnikov)

References

External links
 

Kalinnikov
1897 compositions
Compositions in A major
Compositions by Vasily Kalinnikov